Wreay railway station in St Cuthbert Without parish, was situated on the Lancaster and Carlisle Railway (the West Coast Main Line) between Carlisle and Penrith. It served the village of Wreay, Cumbria, England. The station opened in 1853, and closed on 16 August 1943.

The station
The station had two platforms, a weighing platform and a signal box. The station buildings are now private dwellings. The line is now electrified.

Stations on the line
The next station on the line towards Carlisle was the now closed Brisco and the preceding station was the now closed Southwaite. Brisco railway station proved to be unviable and the decision was made to close it in 1852 in favour of Wreay railway station.

References
Notes

Sources

 

Disused railway stations in Cumbria
Railway stations in Great Britain opened in 1853
Railway stations in Great Britain closed in 1943
Former Lancaster and Carlisle Railway stations